The men's individual W1 archery discipline at the 2020 Summer Paralympics will be contested from 27 to 30 August.

In the ranking rounds each archer shoots 72 arrows, and is seeded according to score. In the knock-out stages each archer shoots three arrows per set against an opponent, the scores being aggregated. Losing semifinalists compete in a bronze medal match. As the field contained 12 archers, the four highest ranked archers will proceed directly to the quarter-final round; the remaining eight will enter in the Round of 16.

Ranking round
The ranking round of the men's individual W1 event was held on 27 August.

Knockout rounds

References

Men's individual W1